Siege of Serres can refer to:

 Siege of Serres (1342), unsuccessful siege of the city by the forces of John VI Kantakouzenos
 Siege of Serres (1345), successful siege and capture of the city by the Serbs of Stephen Dushan